Interferon gamma (IFN-γ) is a dimerized soluble cytokine that is the only member of the type II class of interferons. The existence of this interferon, which early in its history was known as immune interferon, was described by E. F. Wheelock as a product of human leukocytes stimulated with phytohemagglutinin, and by others as a product of antigen-stimulated lymphocytes. It was also shown to be produced in human lymphocytes. or tuberculin-sensitized mouse peritoneal lymphocytes challenged with Mantoux test (PPD); the resulting supernatants were shown to inhibit growth of vesicular stomatitis virus.  Those reports also contained the basic observation underlying the now widely employed IFN-γ release assay used to test for tuberculosis.  In humans, the IFN-γ protein is encoded by the IFNG gene.

Through cell signaling, IFN-γ plays a role in regulating the immune response of its target cell. A key signaling pathway that is activated by type II IFN is the JAK-STAT signaling pathway. IFN-γ plays an important role in both innate and adaptive immunity. Type II IFN is primarily secreted by adaptive immune cells, more specifically CD4+ T helper 1 (Th1) cells, natural killer (NK) cells, and CD8+ cytotoxic T cells. The expression of type II IFN is upregulated and downregulated by cytokines. By activating signaling pathways in cells such as macrophages, B cells, and CD8+ cytotoxic T cells, it is able to promote inflammation, antiviral or antibacterial activity, and cell proliferation and differentiation. Type II IFN is serologically different from interferon type 1, binds to different receptors, and is encoded by a separate chromosomal locus. Type II IFN has played a role in the development of cancer immunotherapy treatments due to its ability to prevent tumor growth.

Function 
IFN-γ, or type II interferon, is a cytokine that is critical for innate and adaptive immunity against viral, some bacterial and protozoan infections. IFN-γ is an important activator of macrophages and inducer of major histocompatibility complex class II molecule expression. Aberrant IFN-γ expression is associated with a number of autoinflammatory and autoimmune diseases. The importance of IFN-γ in the immune system stems in part from its ability to inhibit viral replication directly, and most importantly from its immunostimulatory and immunomodulatory effects. IFN-γ is produced predominantly by natural killer cells (NK) and natural killer T cells (NKT) as part of the innate immune response, and by CD4 Th1 and CD8 cytotoxic T lymphocyte (CTL) effector T cells once antigen-specific immunity develops as part of the adaptive immune response. IFN-γ is also produced by non-cytotoxic innate lymphoid cells (ILC), a family of immune cells first discovered in the early 2010s.

The primary cells that secrete type II IFN are CD4+ T helper 1 (Th1) cells, natural killer (NK) cells, and CD8+ cytotoxic T cells. It can also be secreted by antigen presenting cells (APCs) such as dendritic cells (DCs), macrophages (MΦs), and B cells to a lesser degree. Type II IFN expression is upregulated by the production of interleukin cytokines, such as IL-12, IL-15, IL-18, as well as type I interferons (IFN-α and IFN-β). Meanwhile, IL-4, IL-10, transforming growth factor-beta (TGF-β) and glucocorticoids are known to downregulate type II IFN expression.

Type II IFN is a cytokine, meaning it functions by signaling to other cells in the immune system and influencing their immune response. There are many immune cells type II IFN acts on. Some of its main functions are to induce IgG isotype switching in B cells; upregulate major histocompatibility complex (MHC) class II expression on APCs; induce CD8+ cytotoxic T cell differentiation, activation, and proliferation; and activate macrophages. In macrophages, type II IFN stimulates IL-12 expression. IL-12 in turn promotes the secretion of IFN-γ by NK cells and Th1 cells, and it signals naive T helper cells (Th0) to differentiate into Th1 cells.

Structure 
The IFN-γ monomer consists of a core of six α-helices and an extended unfolded sequence in the C-terminal region. This is shown in the structural models below. The α-helices in the core of the structure are numbered 1 to 6.

The biologically active dimer is formed by anti-parallel inter-locking of the two monomers as shown below. In the cartoon model, one monomer is shown in red, the other in blue.

Receptor binding 

Cellular responses to IFN-γ are activated through its interaction with a heterodimeric receptor consisting of Interferon gamma receptor 1 (IFNGR1) and Interferon gamma receptor 2 (IFNGR2). IFN-γ binding to the receptor activates the JAK-STAT pathway. Activation of the JAK-STAT pathway induces upregulation of interferon-stimulated genes (ISGs), including MHC II. IFN-γ also binds to the glycosaminoglycan heparan sulfate (HS) at the cell surface. However, in contrast to many other heparan sulfate binding proteins, where binding promotes biological activity, the binding of IFN-γ to HS inhibits its biological activity.

The structural models shown in figures 1-3 for IFN-γ are all shortened at their C-termini by 17 amino acids. Full length IFN-γ is 143 amino acids long, the models are 126 amino acids long. Affinity for heparan sulfate resides solely within the deleted sequence of 17 amino acids. Within this sequence of 17 amino acids lie two clusters of basic amino acids termed D1 and D2, respectively. Heparan sulfate interacts with both of these clusters. In the absence of heparan sulfate the presence of the D1 sequence increases the rate at which IFN-γ-receptor complexes form. Interactions between the D1 cluster of amino acids and the receptor may be the first step in complex formation. By binding to D1 HS may compete with the receptor and prevent active receptor complexes from forming.

The biological significance of heparan sulfates interaction with IFN-γ is unclear; however, binding of the D1 cluster to HS may protect it from proteolytic cleavage.

Signaling 
IFN-γ binds to the type II cell-surface receptor, also known as the IFN-gamma receptor (IFNGR) which is part of the class II cytokine receptor family. The IFNGR is composed of two subunits: the IFNGR1 and IFNGR2. IFNGR1 is associated with JAK1 and IFNGR2 is associated with JAK2. Upon IFN-γ binding the receptor, IFNGR1 and IFNGR2 undergo conformational changes that result in the autophosphorylation and activation of JAK1 and JAK2. This leads to a signaling cascade and eventual transcription of target genes. The expression of 236 different genes has been linked to type II IFN-mediated signaling. The proteins expressed by type II IFN-mediated signaling are primarily involved in promoting inflammatory immune responses and regulating other cell-mediated immune responses, such as apoptosis, intracellular IgG trafficking, cytokine signaling and production, hematopoiesis, and cell proliferation and differentiation.

JAK-STAT pathway 
One key pathway triggered by IFN-γ binding IFNGRs is the Janus Kinase and Signal Transducer and Activator of Transcription pathway, more commonly referred to as the JAK-STAT pathway. In the JAK-STAT pathway, activated JAK1 and JAK2 proteins regulate the phosphorylation of tyrosine in STAT1 transcription factors. The tyrosines are phosphorylated at a very specific location, allowing activated STAT1 proteins to interact with each other come together to form STAT1-STAT1 homodimers. The STAT1-STAT1 homodimers can then enter the cell nucleus. They then initiate transcription by binding to gamma interferon activation site (GAS) elements, which are located in the promoter region of interferon-γ stimulated genes (ISGs) that express for antiviral effector proteins, as well as positive and negative regulators of type II IFN signaling pathways.

The JAK proteins also lead to the activation of phosphatidylinositol 3-kinase (PI3K). PI3K leads to the activation of protein kinase C-δ (PKC-δ) which phosphorylates the amino acid serine in STAT1 transcription factors. The phosphorylation of the serine in STAT1-STAT1 homodimers are essential for the full transcription process to occur.

Other signaling pathways 
Other signaling pathways that are triggered by IFN-γ are the mTOR signaling pathway, the MAPK signaling pathway, and the PI3K/AKT signaling pathway.

Biological activity 
IFN-γ is secreted by T helper cells (specifically, Th1 cells), cytotoxic T cells (TC cells), macrophages, mucosal epithelial cells and NK cells. IFN-γ is both an important autocrine signal for professional APCs in early innate immune response, and an important paracrine signal in adaptive immune response. The expression of IFN-γ is induced by the cytokines IL-12, IL-15, IL-18, and type I IFN. IFN-γ is the only Type II interferon and it is serologically distinct from Type I interferons; it is acid-labile, while the type I variants are acid-stable.

IFN-γ has antiviral, immunoregulatory, and anti-tumor properties. It alters transcription in up to 30 genes producing a variety of physiological and cellular responses. Among the effects are:
 Promotes NK cell activity
 Increases antigen presentation and lysosome activity of macrophages.
 Activates inducible nitric oxide synthase (iNOS)
 Induces the production of IgG2a and IgG3 from activated plasma B cells
 Causes normal cells to increase expression of class I MHC molecules as well as class II MHC on antigen-presenting cells—to be specific, through induction of antigen processing genes, including subunits of the immunoproteasome (MECL1, LMP2, LMP7), as well as TAP and ERAAP in addition possibly to the direct upregulation of MHC heavy chains and B2-microglobulin itself
 Promotes adhesion and binding required for leukocyte migration
 Induces the expression of intrinsic defense factors—for example, with respect to retroviruses, relevant genes include TRIM5alpha, APOBEC, and Tetherin, representing directly antiviral effects
 Primes alveolar macrophages against secondary bacterial infections.

IFN-γ is the primary cytokine that defines Th1 cells: Th1 cells secrete IFN-γ, which in turn causes more undifferentiated CD4+ cells (Th0 cells) to differentiate into Th1 cells
, representing a positive feedback loop—while suppressing Th2 cell differentiation. (Equivalent defining cytokines for other cells include IL-4 for Th2 cells and IL-17 for Th17 cells.)

NK cells and CD8+ cytotoxic T cells also produce IFN-γ. IFN-γ suppresses osteoclast formation by rapidly degrading the RANK adaptor protein TRAF6 in the RANK-RANKL signaling pathway, which otherwise stimulates the production of NF-κB.

Activity in granuloma formation
A granuloma is the body's way of dealing with a substance it cannot remove or sterilize. Infectious causes of granulomas (infections are typically the most common cause of granulomas) include tuberculosis, leprosy, histoplasmosis, cryptococcosis, coccidioidomycosis, blastomycosis, and toxoplasmosis. Examples of non-infectious granulomatous diseases are sarcoidosis, Crohn's disease, berylliosis, giant-cell arteritis, granulomatosis with polyangiitis, eosinophilic granulomatosis with polyangiitis, pulmonary rheumatoid nodules, and aspiration of food and other particulate material into the lung. The infectious pathophysiology of granulomas is discussed primarily here.

The key association between IFN-γ and granulomas is that IFN-γ activates macrophages so that they become more powerful in killing intracellular organisms. Activation of macrophages by IFN-γ from Th1 helper cells in mycobacterial infections allows the macrophages to overcome the inhibition of phagolysosome maturation caused by mycobacteria (to stay alive inside macrophages). The first steps in IFN-γ-induced granuloma formation are activation of Th1 helper cells by macrophages releasing IL-1 and IL-12 in the presence of intracellular pathogens, and presentation of antigens from those pathogens. Next the Th1 helper cells aggregate around the macrophages and release IFN-γ, which activates the macrophages. Further activation of macrophages causes a cycle of further killing of intracellular bacteria, and further presentation of antigens to Th1 helper cells with further release of IFN-γ. Finally, macrophages surround the Th1 helper cells and become fibroblast-like cells walling off the infection.

Activity during pregnancy
Uterine Natural Killer cells (NK) secrete high levels of chemoattractants, such as IFN-γ in mice. IFN-γ dilates and thins the walls of maternal spiral arteries to enhance blood flow to the implantation site. This remodeling aids in the development of the placenta as it invades the uterus in its quest for nutrients. IFN-γ knockout mice fail to initiate normal pregnancy-induced modification of decidual arteries. These models display abnormally low amounts of cells or necrosis of decidua.

In humans, elevated levels of IFN-γ have been associated with increased risk of miscarriage. Correlation studies have observed high IFN-γ levels in women with a history of spontaneous miscarriage, when compared to women with no history of spontaneous miscarriage. Additionally, low-IFN-γ levels are associated with women who successfully carry to term. It is possible that IFN-γ is cytotoxic to trophoblasts, which leads to miscarriage. However, causal research on the relationship between IFN-γ and miscarriage has not been performed due to ethical constraints.

Production 
Recombinant human IFN-γ, as an expensive biopharmaceutical, has been expressed in different expression systems including prokaryotic, protozoan, fungal (yeasts), plant, insect and mammalian cells. Human IFN-γ is commonly expressed in Escherichia coli, marketed as ACTIMMUNE®, however, the resulting product of the prokaryotic expression system is not glycosylated with a short half-life in the bloodstream after injection; the purification process from bacterial expression system is also very costly. Other expression systems like Pichia pastoris did not show satisfactory results in terms of yields.

Therapeutic use 

Interferon-γ 1b is approved by the U.S. Food and Drug Administration to treat chronic granulomatous disease (CGD) and osteopetrosis. The mechanism by which IFN-γ benefits CGD is via enhancing the efficacy of neutrophils against catalase-positive bacteria by correcting patients' oxidative metabolism.

It was not approved to treat idiopathic pulmonary fibrosis (IPF). In 2002, the manufacturer InterMune issued a press release saying that phase III data demonstrated survival benefit in IPF and reduced mortality by 70% in patients with mild to moderate disease. The U.S. Department of Justice charged that the release contained false and misleading statements. InterMune's chief executive, Scott Harkonen, was accused of manipulating the trial data, was convicted in 2009 of wire fraud, and was sentenced to fines and community service. Harkonen appealed his conviction to the U.S. Court of Appeals for the Ninth Circuit, and lost. Harkonen was granted a full pardon on January 20, 2021.

Preliminary research on the role of IFN-γ in treating Friedreich's ataxia (FA) conducted by Children’s Hospital of Philadelphia has found no beneficial effects in short-term (< 6-months) treatment. However, researchers in Turkey have discovered significant improvements in patients' gait and stance after 6 months of treatment.

Although not officially approved, Interferon-γ has also been shown to be effective in treating patients with moderate to severe atopic dermatitis. Specifically, recombinant IFN-γ therapy has shown promise in patients with lowered IFN-γ expression, such as those with predisposition to herpes simplex virus, and pediatric patients.

Potential use in immunotherapy
IFN-γ increases an anti-proliferative state in cancer cells, while upregulating MHC I and MHC II expression, which increases immunorecognition and removal of pathogenic cells. IFN-γ also reduces metastasis in tumors by upregulating fibronectin, which negatively impacts tumor architecture.

Cancer immunotherapy 
The goal of cancer immunotherapy is to trigger an immune response by the patient's immune cells to attack and kill malignant (cancer-causing) tumor cells. Type II IFN deficiency has been linked to several types of cancer, including B-cell lymphoma and lung cancer. Furthermore, it has been found that in patients receiving the drug durvalumab to treat non-small cell lung carcinoma and transitional cell carcinoma had higher response rates to the drug, and the drug stunted the progression of both types of cancer for a longer duration of time. Thus, promoting the upregulation of type II IFN has been proven to be a crucial part in creating effective cancer immunotherapy treatments.

IFN-γ is not approved yet for the treatment in any cancer immunotherapy. However, improved survival was observed when IFN-γ was administrated to patients with bladder carcinoma and melanoma cancers. The most promising result was achieved in patients with stage 2 and 3 of ovarian carcinoma. On the contrary, it was stressed: "Interferon-γ secreted by CD8-positive lymphocytes upregulates PD-L1 on ovarian cancer cells and promotes tumour growth." The in vitro study of IFN-γ in cancer cells is more extensive and results indicate anti-proliferative activity of IFN-γ leading to the growth inhibition or cell death, generally induced by apoptosis but sometimes by autophagy. In addition, it has been reported that mammalian glycosylation of recombinant human IFN-γ, expressed in HEK293, improves its therapeutic efficacy compared to the unglycosylated form that is expressed in E. coli.

Involvement in antitumor immunity 
Type II IFN enhances Th1 cell, cytotoxic T cell, and APC activities, which results in an enhanced immune response against the malignant tumor cells, leading to tumor cell apoptosis and necroptosis (cell death). Furthermore, Type II IFN suppresses the activity of regulatory T cells, which are responsible for silencing immune responses against pathogens, preventing the deactivation of the immune cells involved in the killing of the tumor cells. Type II IFN prevents tumor cell division by directly acting on the tumor cells, which results in increased expression of proteins that inhibit the tumor cells from continuing through the cell cycle (i.e., cell cycle arrest). Type II IFN can also prevent tumor growth by indirectly acting on endothelial cells lining the blood vessels close to the site of the tumor, cutting off blood flow to the tumor cells and thus the supply of necessary resources for tumor cell survival and proliferation.

Barriers 
The importance of type II IFN in cancer immunotherapy has been acknowledged; current research is studying the effects of type II IFN on cancer, both as a solo form of treatment and as a form of treatment to be administered alongside other anticancer drugs. But type II IFN has not been approved by the Food and Drug Administration (FDA) to treat cancer, except for malignant osteoporosis. This is most likely due to the fact that while type II IFN is involved in antitumor immunity, some of its functions may enhance the progression of a cancer. When type II IFN acts on tumor cells, it may induce the expression of a transmembrane protein known as programmed death-ligand 1 (PDL1), which allows the tumor cells to evade an attack from immune cells. Type II IFN-mediated signaling may also promote angiogenesis (formation of new blood vessels to the tumor site) and tumor cell proliferation.

Interactions 
Interferon-γ has been shown to interact with Interferon gamma receptor 1 and Interferon gamma receptor 2.

Diseases
Interferon-γ has been shown to be a crucial player in the immune response against some intracellular pathogens, including that of Chagas disease. It has also been identified as having a role in seborrheic dermatitis.

IFN-γ has a significant anti-viral effect in herpes simplex virus I (HSV) infection.  IFN-γ compromises the microtubules that HSV relies upon for transport into an infected cell's nucleus, inhibiting the ability of HSV to replicate. Studies in mice on acyclovir resistant herpes have shown that IFN-γ treatment can significantly reduce herpes viral load. The mechanism by which IFN-γ inhibits herpes reproduction is independent of T-cells, which means that IFN-γ may be an effective treatment in individuals with low T-cells.

Chlamydia infection is impacted by IFN-γ in host cells. In human epithelial cells, IFN-γ upregulates expression of indoleamine 2,3-dioxygenase, which in turn depletes tryptophan in hosts and impedes chlamydia's reproduction. Additionally, in rodent epithelial cells, IFN-γ upregulates a GTPase that inhibits chlamydial proliferation. In both the human and rodent systems, chlamydia has evolved mechanisms to circumvent the negative effects of host cell behavior.

Regulation
There is evidence that interferon-gamma expression is regulated by a pseudoknotted element in its 5' UTR.
There is also evidence that interferon-gamma is regulated either directly or indirectly by the microRNAs: miR-29.
Furthermore, there is evidence that interferon-gamma expression is regulated via GAPDH in T-cells. This interaction takes place in the 3'UTR, where binding of GAPDH prevents the translation of the mRNA sequence.

References

Further reading

External links 
 
 
 

Antiviral drugs
Cytokines
Immunostimulants
Hoffmann-La Roche brands